Albert Frederick Toll (1865–1960) was the founder of Australia and New Zealand's largest transport company, Toll Group and Toll NZ and a former mayor of Wickham, New South Wales.

He founded Toll in 1888, when he hauled coal with a horse and a cart.

He was the father of Australian novelist Dora Birtles and founding president of Lake Macquarie Yacht Club, Victor Toll. A street in the Lake Macquarie suburb Valentine, Albert Street, was named after him.

References

External links
Glimpse of Newcastle's history revealed

1865 births
1960 deaths
Australian company founders
Toll Group